The following lists events that happened during 1962 in the Islamic Republic of Pakistan.

Incumbents
President: Ayub Khan
Chief Justice: A.R. Cornelius

Events

 March 1, President Ayub Khan promulgates a constitution which sought to reinforce his authority in the absence of martial law.
 April, Elections for the National and provincial assembly were held on the basis of Basic Democracies.
 July, the National Assembly passes the Political Parties Act, legalizing the formation of political parties.

See also
 List of Pakistani films of 1962

 
Pakistan